"Because You Loved Me" is a song by Canadian singer Celine Dion from her fourth English-language studio album, Falling into You (1996). It was released on 19 February 1996 as the first single in North America and as the second single in the United Kingdom on 20 May 1996. "Because You Loved Me" was written by Diane Warren and produced by David Foster, and served as the theme song from the 1996 film Up Close & Personal, starring Robert Redford and Michelle Pfeiffer. Billboard ranked it as the 14th Top Love Song Of All Time.

"Because You Loved Me" received critical acclaim and became a worldwide hit, reaching number one in the United States, Canada and Australia, and reaching top ten in many other countries. In the United States alone, it has sold over two million copies. "Because You Loved Me" won the Grammy Award for Best Song Written for Visual Media, and was nominated for the Grammy Award for Record of the Year, Song of the Year and Best Female Pop Vocal Performance. It was also nominated for the Academy Award for Best Original Song and Golden Globe Award for Best Original Song. The single sold more than five million copies in its first six months of availability worldwide.

Composition and release

"Because You Loved Me" was written by Diane Warren and produced by David Foster. Both Warren and Foster worked with Dion on her previous English-language albums. The song is a downtempo pop ballad in which the singer thanks a loyal loved one for guiding, encouraging, and protecting her throughout her life, and making her who she is today. Warren said that the song was a tribute to her father. "Because You Loved Me" served as the theme song from the 1996 film Up Close & Personal, starring Robert Redford and Michelle Pfeiffer. However, the song was not included on the film's soundtrack. "Because You Loved Me" was released as the first single from Falling into You in North America. It was issued as the second single in the United Kingdom (May 1996), after "Falling into You".

The song is written in the key of D major with a slow tempo of 60 beats per minute.  Dion's vocals span from A3 to A5 in the song.  The final chorus is set in E major.

Critical reception
"Because You Loved Me" received positive reviews from most music critics. The Advocate described it as a "big ballad" and an "emotional roller coaster". Senior editor of AllMusic, Stephen Thomas Erlewine praised ballads like "Because You Loved Me" on the Falling into You album. Larry Flick from Billboard wrote that it is, "rife with grand romance, larger-than-life production, and a climax that is best described as the musical equivalent to 4th of July fireworks". Another Billboard editor, Paul Verna also highlighted the song. Daina Darzin from Cash Box declared it as "a classic Adult Contemporary ballad, [with] sparkling, lush instrumentals showcasing Dion's effortless, accomplished voice. This tune's in line to follow the success of material from Waiting To Exhale and other romantic blockbusters." Dave Sholin from the Gavin Report wrote, "How about this daring prediction: It'll be one of the first major hits of 1996! An expected Celine Dion media blitz this spring is certain to take her and this project far into the next galaxy". The Hartford Courant noted it as a "luxurious love song". A reviewer from Music Week rated it five out of five, adding that it "tugs the heartstrings like a surefire winner." Stephen Holden of The New York Times praised the song, calling it this year's "Wind Beneath My Wings". Richmond Times-Dispatch picked "Because You Loved Me" as one of the best songs on Falling into You. Christopher Smith from TalkAboutPopMusic described it as a "beautiful, soulful ballad in her own inimitable way" and noted that Dion "turns on the power over the final choruses."

Commercial performance
In the United States, "Because You Loved Me" became Dion's second number one single, after "The Power of Love" in 1994. It topped the Billboard Hot 100 chart for six consecutive weeks and ended the reign at the top of "One Sweet Day" by Mariah Carey and Boyz II Men. "Because You Loved Me" also topped the Adult Contemporary Singles for nineteen weeks and set a record for most weeks at number one on this chart. In the following years, only five songs spent more time at the top, including Dion's own "A New Day Has Come" in 2002 (twenty-one weeks). "Because You Loved Me" also reached number one on other US charts, including Hot 100 Airplay for fourteen weeks, Adult Top 40 for twelve weeks, Hot Singles Sales for six weeks and Mainstream Top 40 for five weeks. In April 1996, it was certified Platinum by the RIAA for selling one million copies in the US. , "Because You Loved Me" has sold 1,343,000 physical copies and 704,000 digital units, for a total of 2,047,000 copies. According to Billboard, "Because You Loved Me" is Dion's biggest Billboard Hot 100 hit, followed by "It's All Coming Back to Me Now," also from Falling into You. By the end of the 1996, "Because You Loved Me" was the most played music video on VH1 Music Fest, 21st most played on MTV Music Television, 16th most played on Much Music and 11th most played on MOR Music.

In Canada, "Because You Loved Me" topped The Record Singles Chart for one week in May 1996 and also spent ten weeks at number one on the RPM Adult Contemporary Chart. It became the number-one song on the RPM Adult Contemporary 1996 Year-end Chart. "Because You Loved Me" also topped the chart in Australia for three weeks and reached number two in Ireland, number three in New Zealand and Switzerland, number four in the Netherlands, number five in the United Kingdom and Belgium Flanders, and number eight in Denmark.

In the United Kingdom, it peaked at number five and became the album's most popular track with 27 million streams, 366,000 physical CD sales and 163,000 downloads as of March 2021.

It was certified 2× Platinum in Australia, Platinum the United Kingdom and New Zealand, Gold in Germany and is eligible for Silver in France. As one of Dion's biggest hits, "Because You Loved Me" was included on her both greatest hits compilations: All the Way... A Decade of Song (1999) and My Love: Essential Collection (2008). According to Billboard, as of November 2019 "Because You Loved Me" had over 154.7 million on-demand streams in the United States, becoming her second most streamed song in the country.

Awards and accolades
At the 39th Annual Grammy Awards, "Because You Loved Me" was nominated for Record of the Year, Best Female Pop Vocal Performance, Song of the Year and won the Grammy Award for Best Song Written Specifically for a Motion Picture or Television. At the Juno Awards of 1997, "Because You Loved Me" was nominated for the Juno Award for Single of the Year. It was also nominated for four Billboard Music Awards in 1996 in categories: Hot 100 Singles, Hot 100 Singles Airplay, Hot Adult Contemporary Singles & Tracks and Hot Adult Top 40 Singles & Tracks. Additionally, "Because You Loved Me" was nominated for the Academy Award for Best Original Song, Golden Globe Award for Best Original Song and Blockbuster Entertainment Award for Favourite Song from a Movie. It also won the ASCAP Film and Television Music Award for Most Performed Song from Motion Picture and the ASCAP Pop Awards for Most Performed Song in 1997, 1998 and 1999.

In 2017, About.com placed the song at number 10 in their ranking of "Top 10 Celine Dion Songs".

Music video
A music video was created for the song and showed Dion singing in a newsroom surrounded by several TV monitors (which is where the majority of the film takes place) interspersed with clips from the film Up Close & Personal. It was directed by Kevin Bray in January 1996 and released in March 1996.

At the height of the song's popularity, it was played during the Nebraska Cornhuskers football team's spring game on 20 April 1996 for a football montage video tribute to quarterback Brook Berringer, who had died two days earlier in a plane crash.

Live performances
During the promotion of Falling into You, Dion performed "Because You Loved Me" on various television shows in the United States, Italy, Germany and the Netherlands. She also performed it at the Blockbuster Entertainment Awards and World Music Awards in 1996, and most notably at the 69th Academy Awards in March 1997. "Because You Loved Me" became a part of the Falling Into You Around the World Tour, Let's Talk About Love World Tour and Taking Chances World Tour. It was also performed during Dion's two Las Vegas shows, A New Day... and Celine. The live performances of "Because You Loved Me" were included on Live in Memphis (1998), All the Way... A Decade of Song & Video (2001), A New Day... Live in Las Vegas (2004), Live in Las Vegas: A New Day... (2007) and Taking Chances World Tour: The Concert (2010). Dion performed "Because You Loved Me" during her Summer Tour 2016, her 2017 European tour, and 2018 tour. On 5 July 2019, Dion performed "Because You Loved Me" during her BST Hyde Park concert in London, and continued performing the song on her Courage World Tour.

Track listings

Credits and personnel
Recording
Recorded at Chartmaker Studios, Capitol Studios and Rumbo Recorders
Mixed at The Record Plant

Personnel

Songwriter – Diane Warren
Producer – David Foster
Lead vocal – Celine Dion 
Executive producer for Up Close & Personal – Jon Avnet
Background vocals arrangers – Sue Ann Carwell, Carl Carwell, David Foster
Engineer – Felipe Elgueta
Lead vocal recording – Humberto Gatica
Assistant engineers – Peter Doell, Mark Agostino
Mix – Humberto Gatica
Assistants – Chris Brooke, Paul Boutin, Kyle Bess
Keyboards – David Foster
Synclavier programming – Simon Franglen
Guitars – Michael Thompson
Background vocals – Sue Ann Carwell, Carl Carwell, Kofi, Terry Bradford, Alex Brown, Philip Ingram, Maxann Lewis, Will Heaton, Bridgette Bryant-Fiddmont, Alanna Capps

Charts

Weekly charts

Year-end charts

Decade-end charts

All-time charts

Certifications and sales

Release history

See also

1996 in British music
Billboard Year-End Hot 100 singles of 1996
Grammy Award for Best Song Written for Visual Media
List of Adult Top 40 number-one songs of the 1990s
List of Australian chart achievements and milestones
List of Billboard Hot 100 number-one singles of 1996
List of Billboard Hot 100 number-one singles of the 1990s
List of Billboard Hot 100 top 10 singles in 1996
List of Billboard Mainstream Top 40 number-one songs of the 1990s
List of number-one adult contemporary singles of 1996 (U.S.)
List of number-one singles in Australia during the 1990s
List of Top 25 singles for 1996 in Australia
List of UK top 10 singles in 1996

References

External links

1996 singles
1996 songs
1990s ballads
Billboard Hot 100 number-one singles
Celine Dion songs
Grammy Award for Best Song Written for Visual Media
Love themes
Milly Quezada songs
Music videos directed by Kevin Bray (director)
Number-one singles in Australia
Pop ballads
Contemporary R&B ballads
Song recordings produced by David Foster
Songs written by Diane Warren
Columbia Records singles
Epic Records singles